Joseph Freeman (1897–1965) was an American writer and magazine editor. He is best remembered as an editor of The New Masses, a literary and artistic magazine closely associated with the Communist Party USA, and as a founding editor of the magazine Partisan Review.

Background
Joseph Freeman was born October 7, 1897, in the village of Piratin, part of the Poltava district in the Ukraine, which was then part of the Russian empire. Freeman's parents, Stella and Isaac Freeman, were of ethnic Jewish extraction, forced to live in the Pale of Settlement by the anti-semitic laws of the Tsarist regime. At the behest of his grandfather, Freeman spoke Yiddish as a small boy. His parents worked as shopkeepers.

In his memoirs, Freeman recalled a traumatic boyhood incident which had followed shortly after a pogrom of the Jewish population of a neighboring town:

Along with hundreds of thousands of others fleeing ethnic violence in Russia, the Freemans emigrated to the United States in 1904. Joseph was naturalized as a US citizen in 1920. In the new world, the Freemans managed to achieve a middle class existence in Brooklyn, New York, with Isaac Freeman earning a living in America as a real estate dealer.

Freeman joined the Socialist Party of America in 1914, when he was 17 years old. He worked as a telegraph clerk, a waiter, and a retail clerk during his college years.

Freeman attended Columbia University in New York City, from which he graduated with a Bachelor's degree in 1919.

Career

Following graduation from Columbia, Freeman went to work on the editorial staff of a book project initiated by Harper's Magazine entitled Illustrated History of the World War. He also worked on the editorial staff of Women's Wear in 1919 and 1920.

Freeman went abroad in 1920 to take a position on the staff of the Paris edition of the Chicago Tribune, later moving to London to work for the paper from that location.

In 1922 Freeman returned to New York City, where he shortly took a position on the staff of Garment News, the New York-based publication of the Amalgamated Clothing Workers Union. He became a member of editorial staff of the left wing artistic magazine The Liberator in 1922 and became Associate Editor of that publication in 1923.

Freeman became a member of the Workers Party of America, forerunner of the Communist Party USA during this interval. He was subsequently active in various mass organizations of the party, including the American Committee for Protection of Foreign Born and the All-America Anti-Imperialist League.

In 1924, Freeman became the publicity director of the American Civil Liberties Union (ACLU).

In 1926, Freeman became a co-founder and a founding editor of The New Masses magazine.  From 1926 to 1927, he was the magazine's correspondent in Moscow.  In 1929, he was the magazine's editor in Mexico.

Freeman's brother, Harry Freeman, introduced Whittaker Chambers to the Daily Worker newspaper.  Chambers socialized with the brothers and their circle, which Chambers said included TASS.  Freeman worked for TASS in the late 1920s, followed by brother Harry in 1929.  From 1931-1933, he became editor again at The New Masses magazine, during the period when Chambers joined the Soviet Underground (1932). The Freeman's social circle included Harry's wife Vera Schaap (wife of Al Schaap, a Young Communist League founder), Sender Garlin, Abe Magill, James S. Allen, Joseph North (of the Daily Worker and The New Masses), Anna Rochester, Grace Hutchins, Nadya Pavlov, and Kenneth Durant.

Freeman was a founding editor of the magazine Partisan Review in 1934, a publication which touted itself as "A Bi-Monthly of Revolutionary Literature Published by the John Reed Club of New York." The magazine was launched with the understanding that it would concentrate primarily on literary and cultural themes, thereby leaving The New Masses to pursue a heavier portion of political themes.

In 1936-1937, Freeman served again as editor of The New Masses.

In 1939, he left the Communist Party.  About that time, he worked as a freelance writer for publications including The Nation, Fortune, and Life.

In 1940, Freeman returned to the ACLU for a second stint as its publicity director, working in that capacity until 1942. He then moved into radio, working on the editorial staff of a news program called "Information Please."

From 1948 until 1961, Freeman worked in the private sector in the field of public relations, employed by the firms of Edward L. Bernays (1948-1952) and Executive Research, Inc. (1952-1961).

Personal life and death

In 1929, while working for TASS in Mexico, Freeman met and married Ione Robinson, an American painter who modeled for and studied under Diego Rivera. They divorced in 1931.

Freeman married American journalist, abstract painter, and art critic, Charmion von Wiegand, in 1932 or 1934, in New York.

Joseph Freeman died on August 8, 1965. He was 67 years old at the time of his death.

Legacy

Some of Freeman's papers, consisting of 4 linear feet of material, are housed in the Rare Book and Manuscript Library of Columbia University in New York City.
His correspondence and other of his papers (81.4 linear feet) are in the Hoover Institution Archives at Stanford University. See the Register of the Joseph Freeman Papers, 1904-1966; Stanford
 Master negative microfilm of The New Masses, the magazine with which Freeman was most closely associated, is held by New York Public Library.

Works
In 1936, Freeman published his memoirs, An American Testament: A Narrative of Rebels and Romantics.

 Dollar Diplomacy: A Study in American Imperialism. Co-author with Scott Nearing. New York: Vanguard Press, 1925.
 Voices of October: Art and Literature in Soviet Russia. Co-editor, with Joshua Kunitz and Louis Lozowick. New York: Vanguard Press, 1930.
 The Soviet Worker: An Account of the Economic, Social and Cultural Status of Labor in the USSR. New York: International Publishers, 1932.
 The Background of German Fascism. New York: International Publishers, n.d. [c. 1932].
 Proletarian Literature in the United States: An Anthology. Co-editor with Granville Hicks. New York: International Publishers, 1936.
 An American Testament: A Narrative of Rebels and Romantics. New York: Farrar and Rinehart, 1936.
 Never Call Retreat. New York: Farrar and Rinehart, 1943.
 The Long Pursuit. New York: Farrar and Rinehart, 1947.

Footnotes

Further reading

 Bloom, James. Left Letters: The Culture Wars of Mike Gold and Joseph Freeman. New York: Columbia University Press, 1992.
 Wald, Alan M. Exiles from a Future Time: The Forging of the Mid-Twentieth-Century Literary Left. Durham, NC: University of North Carolina Press, 2001.

External links
 Finding Aid for the Joseph Freeman Papers, Butler Library, Columbia University, New York.
 New Masses high resolution archive, Riazanov Library digital archive project via Marxists Internet Archive, www.marxists.org/ —Includes years 1926-1936 scanned from original paper.

1897 births
1965 deaths
Columbia University alumni
Emigrants from the Russian Empire to the United States
Ukrainian Jews
Jewish American writers
Jewish socialists
American people of Ukrainian-Jewish descent
American Marxists
Members of the Socialist Party of America
American communists
Members of the Communist Party USA